The National Performing Arts School (NPAS) is located in Dublin, Ireland.  The school is for students aged from 2 to 22 years old. Courses available include drama, singing and dancing. Every two years a show is performed in the Olympia Theatre. The NPAS is run by Jill Doyle and Eamon Farrell (brother of Colin Farrell). They also run various workshops throughout the year.

Location 
NPAS is located in 'The Factory', a rehearsal, recording and performance space. It opened 25 years ago with U2 rehearsing their Rattle and Hum world tour. Other performers, such as Britney Spears to Pink, and The Abbey Theatre to Riverdance, have also rehearsed there.

Notable alumni

 Colin Farrell
 Devon Murray
 Eve Hewson
 Rúaidhrí Conroy
 Danny O'Donoghue
 Mark Sheehan
 Keavy Lynch
 Edele Lynch
 Hudson Taylor
 Carly Smithson

References

External links

Arts in Dublin (city)
Education in Dublin (city)
Performing arts education in Ireland
Buildings and structures in Dublin (city)
Schools of the performing arts